The 2011 NCAA Division I women's volleyball tournament began on December 1, 2011 and ended on December 17 at the Alamodome in San Antonio, Texas when UCLA defeated Illinois 3 sets to 1 in the national championship match.

Qualifying teams

Records

Lexington Regional

Minneapolis Regional

Gainesville Regional

Honolulu Regional

Final Four - Alamodome, San Antonio, Texas

See also
NCAA Women's Volleyball Championship
AVCA
AIAW Women's Volleyball Championship

Notes
 December 15, 2011 – Head coach Michael Sealy of UCLA was named the National Coach of the Year by the American Volleyball Coaches Association (AVCA)
 Rachael Kidder of UCLA was the most outstanding player
 All-tournament Team: Alex Jupiter, USC; Zoe Nightingale, UCLA; Lauren Van Orden, UCLA; Annie Luhrsen, Illinois; Michelle Bartsch, Illinois; Colleen Ward, Illinois; Rachael Kidder, UCLA

References

NCAA Women's Volleyball Championship
NCAA
2011 in sports in Texas
Volleyball in Texas
December 2011 sports events in the United States
Sports competitions in San Antonio
Women's sports in Texas
College sports tournaments in Texas